Critical success factor (CSF) is a management term for an element that is necessary for an organization or project to achieve its mission. To achieve their goals they need to be aware of each key success factor (KSF) and the variations between the keys and the different roles key result area (KRA). 

A CSF is a critical factor or activity required for ensuring the success of a company or an organization. The term was initially used in the world of data analysis and business analysis. For example, a CSF for a successful Information Technology project is user involvement.

Critical success factors should not be confused with success criteria. The latter are outcomes of a project or achievements of an organization necessary to consider the project a success or the organization successful. Success criteria are defined with the objectives and may be quantified by key performance indicators (KPIs).

There are many tools to help to implement The keys Success Factor like Business Model Canvas that will help to achieve a Business model or just a goal.

Concept history
The concept of "success factors" was developed by D. Ronald Daniel of McKinsey & Company, who published an article entitled "Management Information Crisis" in the Harvard Business Review in 1961. The process was refined into critical success factors by John F. Rockart between 1979  and 1981. In 1995, James A. Johnson and Michael Friesen applied it to many sector settings, including healthcare.

Relation to Key Success Area and Key Success Factors 

The Critical Success Factor is basically the main system to achieve successes in a company, but to make that possible is necessary to put together the Key Success Factor that needs to be personalized depending on the department, each role has their own Key Success Area. These systems try to achieve success for the company based in standards and rules that need to be followed step by step to guarantee a better service for the clients or partners.

Key Result Area (KRAs) 

Key result areas or KRAs refer to the rules for a specific role in a company. The terms highlight the scope of the job profile for the employee, enabling them to have a better view of their possible role in the company. Which KRA will defer from each other depending on the department.

The Key Result Area is a specific role which each department need to follow to deliver the goods or services in perfect condition to the final customer or to another department which will have different KSFs.

Key Success Factors (KSFs)

In project management, multiple cross-cultural studies spread over decades have shown that the basic Key Success Factors 
can be summarized as follows:

Steps to achieve the Key Success Factors 

The company needs to be aware that it is essential to pull together the team that will be working with the CSFs, its necessary to have employees submit their ideas or give feedback. Never forget to have multiple frameworks to examine the key elements of your long-term goals. Before implementing your company-wide strategic plan with your critical success factors in mind, determine which factors are key in achieving your long-term organizational plan.

Skills

The leader needs to be trained and prepared to put the company in the line of success. Some of the skills that can be learned are financial management, marketing sales, and customer service, communication and negotiation, project management and planning, leadership, problem-solving and, lastly, but one of the most important skills, networking.

Communication
The company needs to put together all the staffs, all of the giving opinions about what could be better to achieve their goal. The company needs to pay attention in two parts of the communication process: the Initial Launch Communications, which will set the plan to be achieved and the Ongoing Communications, which will be the part where the KSF progress (Contact us is a way to know if the KSF is working well).

Planning

To use the CSFs everything needs to be planned, how employees will do it and why. Tools can be used to make planning work faster and easier. A strategy for each department can be planned separately.

Team Work

A good teamwork is the key to success, when all the staff collaborate more ideas and opinions can be discussed to find the best way to achieve success.

Process

A business process or business method is a collection of related, structured activities or tasks by people or equipment which in a specific sequence produce a service or product (serves a particular business goal) for a particular customer or customers. Business processes occur at all organizational levels and may or may not be visible to the customers. A business process may often be visualized (modeled) as a flowchart of a sequence of activities with interleaving decision points or as a process matrix of a sequence of activities with relevance rules based on data in the process. The benefits of using business processes include improved customer satisfaction and improved agility for reacting to rapid market change.

See also
 Business model
 Customer relationship management
 Business Model Canvas

Further reading

 David Parmenter, Key Performance Indicators. John Wiley & Sons 2007, .
 Klaus G. Grunert and Charlotte Ellegaard. The Concept of Key Success Factors: Theory and Method, 1992, ISSN 0907-2101. 
 Michael Amberg. Background of Critical Success Factor Research, 2005

References

Business terms
Strategic management